We Could Be Together is a career-spanning box set by American singer-songwriter Debbie Gibson. Named after Gibson's 1989 single of the same name, it was released on October 20, 2017 by Edsel Records, celebrating her 30th anniversary in the music industry. The 12" x 12" box set consists of eight of her studio albums appended with bonus tracks (excluding her 2003 cover album Colored Lights: The Broadway Album), a remix album, and a bonus album of rare tracks, plus three DVDs and a 32-page coffee table book. An Amazon exclusive release included a signed 12" x 12" frameable print and was limited to 750 copies.

The box set was named "Best Reissue" on Pop Dose's Best of 2017: 10 Albums for the Buy Curious.

Track listing
All tracks are written by Deborah Gibson, except where indicated.

DVD 1 - The Videos

DVD 2

DVD 3

References

External links
 
 

2017 compilation albums
Debbie Gibson compilation albums